Jessy Terrero (born October 7, 1972) is a Dominican film and music video director.

Career
Terrero appeared as an extra on the 1992 film Juice starring Tupac Shakur. According to Terrero, it was his experience on the set of the movie that inspired him to become a director.

Terrero shot his first student film on Super 8. After college, he landed an associate producer internship on the set of Darnell Martin's I Like It Like That.

In 1996, he teamed up with his brother and formed T and T Casting, supervising extras casting for low-budget films.

His acting credits include appearances in Law & Order, The Sopranos and In Search of a Dream (Buscando un sueño).

Tererro's film director credits include the short film The Clinic. He made his movie directorial debut with the film Soul Plane in 2004. In 2009 Brooklyn to Manhattan was in production. Terrero also directed Freelancers, starring Robert De Niro, Forest Whitaker, and 50 Cent. The movie was released in 2012.

In 2014, Terrero founded Cinema Giants. In addition to being the production house for music videos, Cinema Giants has also served as a production company for films and television. Directors currently associated with Cinema Giants include Terrero, Mike Ho, Rodrigo Films, Roxana Baldovin, and Steven Gomillion.

Terrero directed Nicky Jam: El Ganador, a bio-series about the life and career of reggaeton artist Nicky Jam. The series was released on Netflix in Latin America on 30 November 2018, and on Telemundo in the U.S. and Puerto Rico in 2019.

Terrero directed the YouTube Originals documentary Maluma: Lo Que Era, Lo Que Soy, Lo Que Seré, a documentary about Colombian singer Maluma. It premiered on 5 June 2019. The next year, on 7 October 2020, Bravas, another YouTube original series produced and directed by Terrero, was released. The series, in addition to Terrero, was also executive produced by Dominican singer Natti Natasha.

Terrero is best known for directing music videos for an international clientele of famous artists including Jill Scott, Lionel Richie, Syleena Johnson, 50 Cent, Wisin y Yandel, Daddy Yankee, Ludacris, Akon, Paulina Rubio, Enrique Iglesias, Sean Paul, Aventura, and many others. Since 2000, Terrero's name has become linked with hip hop and reggaeton for directing popular videos for critically acclaimed artists such as Wisin y Yandel, 50 Cent, G-Unit, Daddy Yankee, and Don Omar. In 2009, Terrero directed Wisin y Yandel's MTV VMA-nominated video "Abusadora."

In recent years, Terrero has found success working with artists such as Ricky Martin, Maluma, Nicky Jam, J Balvin, Bad Bunny, Jennifer Lopez, and the Weeknd, among other artists.

Filmography

As actor

As director

Music videography
2000: "Deport Them" - Sean Paul
2000: "Gettin' In the Way" - Jill Scott
2000: "A Long Walk" - Jill Scott
2001: "Tarantula" - Mystikal ft. Butch Cassidy
2001: "I" - Petey Pablo ft. Timbaland
2001: "Raise Up" - Petey Pablo
2001: "Parents Just Don't Understand"- Lil' Romeo ft. 3LW and Nick Cannon
2002: "Wanksta" - 50 Cent
2002: "Good Times" - Styles P
2003: "Many Men" - 50 Cent
2003: "Right Thurr" - Chingy
2003: "Too Much for Me" - DJ Kay Slay ft. Amerie & Foxy Brown
2004: "Wanna Get to Know You" - G-Unit ft. Joe
2004: "Smile" - G-Unit
2004: "On Fire" - Lloyd Banks
2004: "Lean Back" - Terror Squad
2005: "Candy Shop" - 50 Cent ft. Olivia
2005: "We Be Burnin'" - Sean Paul
2005: "No Daddy" - Teairra Mari
2005: "And Then What" - Young Jeezy ft. Mannie Fresh
2005: "Can You Believe It" - Styles P ft. Akon
2005: "She Says" - Unwritten Law
2006: "Say Goodbye" - Chris Brown
2006: "Conteo" - Don Omar
2006: "Give It To Me" - Mobb Deep ft. Young Buck
2006: "Los Infieles" - Aventura
2006: "Noche de Entierro (Nuestro Amor)" - Daddy Yankee, Wisin & Yandel, Héctor el Father, Tony Tun-Tun & Zion
2006: "Yo Te Quiero" - Wisin & Yandel
2006: "Runaway Love" - Ludacris ft. Mary J. Blige
2006: "Never Gonna Be The Same" - Sean Paul
2006: "Show Stopper" - Danity Kane ft. Yung Joc
2007: "Dimelo" - Enrique Iglesias
2007: "Sexy Movimiento" - Wisin & Yandel
2007: "Ahora Es" - Wisin & Yandel
2007: "Watch Them Roll" - Sean Paul
2007: "I'll Still Kill" - 50 Cent ft. Akon
2008: "Oye, ¿Dónde Está El Amor?" - Wisin & Yandel
2008: "Back to You" - Veze ft. MYRA
2008: "Síguelo" - Wisin & Yandel
2008: "Dime Qué Te Pasó" - Wisin & Yandel
2008: "Me Estás Tentando" - Wisin & Yandel
2008: "Bleeding Love" - Leona Lewis
2008: "Pose" - Daddy Yankee
2008: "I Like the Way She Do It" - G-Unit
2008: "Rider Pt. 2" - G-Unit
2008: "Vacation" - Young Jeezy
2009: "Me Estás Tentando" [Official Remix] - Wisin & Yandel ft. Franco "El Gorilla" & Jayko "El Prototipo"
2009: "Por Un Segundo" - Aventura
2009: "Mujeres En El Club" - Wisin & Yandel featuring 50 Cent
2009: "Battle Cry" - Shontelle
2009: "Lover" [Official Remix] - De La Ghetto ft. Juelz Santana
2009: "All Up 2 You" - Aventura ft. Wisin & Yandel & Akon
2009: "Abusadora" - Wisin & Yandel
2009: "Remember Me" - T.I. ft. Mary J. Blige
2009: "Press It Up" - Sean Paul
2009: "Gracias a Tí" [Remix] - Wisin & Yandel ft. Enrique Iglesias
2009: "Ni Rosas Ni Juguetes" - Paulina Rubio
2009: "Imagínate" - Wisin & Yandel ft. T-Pain
2010: "Te Siento" - Wisin & Yandel
2010: "Algo De Ti" - Paulina Rubio
2010: "Cuando Me Enamoro" - Enrique Iglesias ft. Juan Luis Guerra
2010: “No Dejemos Que se Apague” - Wisin & Yandel ft. T-Pain & 50 Cent
2010: "Buzzin'" - Mann ft. 50 Cent
2011: "Tony Montana" - Future
2012: "Follow the Leader" - Wisin & Yandel ft. Jennifer Lopez
2012: "Algo Me Gusta de Ti / Something About You'' - Wisin & Yandel ft. Chris Brown & T-Pain
2012: "Limbo" - Daddy Yankee
2012: "Un Chance Más" - Mozart La Para
2013: "Baby You" - El Poeta Callejero
2013: "Descontrol" - Somaya Reece ft. Lapiz Conciente & Anís
2013: "Como Le Gusta a Tu Cuerpo" - Carlos Vives ft. Michel Teló
2013: "Live It Up" - Jennifer Lopez ft. Pitbull
2013: "La Luz" - Juanes
2014: "Adrenalina" - Wisin featuring Ricky Martin and Jennifer Lopez
2014: "I Luh Ya Papi" - Jennifer Lopez
2014: "La Botella" - Zion & Lennox
2015: "Rumba" - Anahí featuring Wisin
2015: "Sígueme y Te Sigo" - Daddy Yankee
2015: "Nota de Amor" - Wisin & Carlos Vives featuring Daddy Yankee
2015: "Que Se Sienta El Deseo" - Wisin featuring Ricky Martin
2016: "Culpa al Corazón" - Prince Royce
2016: "El Perdedor" - Maluma
2016: "Sim ou Não" - Anitta featuring Maluma
2016: "Vente Pa' Ca" - Ricky Martin featuring Maluma
2016: "Vacaciones" - Wisin
2017: "Felices los 4" - Maluma
2017: "Escapate Conmigo" - Wisin featuring Ozuna
2017: "Como Antes" - Yandel featuring Wisin
2017: "Bella y Sensual" - Romeo Santos, Daddy Yankee, & Nicky Jam
2017: "Corazón" - Maluma featuring Nego do Borel
2018: "X" - Nicky Jam & J Balvin
2018: "El Préstamo" - Maluma
2018: "Me Lloras" - Gloria Trevi featuring Charly Black
2018: "Mala Mia" - Maluma
2018: "Jaleo" - Nicky Jam & Steve Aoki
2019: "Aullando" - Wisin & Yandel featuring Romeo Santos
2019: "Te Robaré" - Nicky Jam & Ozuna
2019: "Ni Bien Ni Mal" - Bad Bunny
2020: "Hawái" - Maluma
2020: "Pa' Ti + Lonely" - Jennifer Lopez & Maluma
2020: "Hawái" [Remix] - Maluma & The Weeknd
2021: "Qué Rico Fuera" - Ricky Martin & Paloma Mami
2021: "Cambia el Paso" - Jennifer Lopez & Rauw Alejandro

Nominations
 Jill Scott, Gettin' In The Way, MTV Video Music Awards, 2001.
 Jill Scott, Gettin' In The Way, M2 Awards Finalist, 2001.
 Jill Scott, Gettin' In The Way, Billboard Music Video Awards, 2001.
 Syleena Johnson, I Am Your Woman, Billboard Music Video Awards, 2001.
 50 Cent, Candy Shop, MTV Video Music Awards, 2005.
 Wisin y Yandel, Abusadora, MTV Video Music Awards, 2009.

See also
Lists of people from the Dominican Republic.

References

External links
 
 

1972 births
Expatriate male actors in the United States
Dominican Republic film directors
Dominican Republic male film actors
Dominican Republic male television actors
Living people
20th-century male actors
21st-century male actors